Ardern George Hulme Beaman (1857–1929) was a British adventurer, author, diplomat and war correspondent.

Biography

Born in 1857 in Hoshangabad, India, where his father was an assistant surgeon in the Indian Medical Service, Ardern Hulme Beaman was educated at Bedford School. He became Acting British Vice consul in Beirut, Damascus and Cairo, and was engaged at the British Consulate in Cairo in July 1882 at the time of the Bombardment of Alexandria by the Royal Navy. He subsequently attached himself to Lord Charles Beresford, to the headquarters staff of Lord Wolseley, and to Sir Charles Wilson. In December 1882, he observed the court-martial of Ahmed ‘Urabi on behalf of the British Government, and attached himself to Sir Henry Drummond Wolff and to Lord Dufferin in Egypt. After defending prisoners before the Alexandria court-martial he joined the staff of the London Evening Standard in 1883, and became its correspondent in Egypt, Romania, Serbia, Bulgaria, Russia, Turkey, and Austria-Hungary.  He was the London Evening Standard's war correspondent during the British Nile Expedition, between 1884 and 1885, and during the Cretan Insurrection, between 1897 and 1898. He was the London Evening Standard's Paris correspondent between 1907 and 1916, joining the Intelligence Staff of the general officer commanding British forces in Egypt between April 1916 and September 1921.

The brother of Sir Frank Beaman, Puisne Judge in the High Court, Bombay, Ardern Hulme Beaman died in London on 23 July 1929.

Publications

Ardern Hulme Beaman was the author of a life of Stefan Stambolov, 1896,  Twenty Years in the Near East, 1898, Pons Asinorum or Bridge for Beginners: A Short Treatise on the New Game of Bridge, 1899, English and Continental Bridge, 1902, Travels without Baedeker, 1913, and a translation of Leo Tolstoy's Master and Man, 1895.

References

External links 

1857 births
1929 deaths
People educated at Bedford School
British war correspondents
English war correspondents
British male journalists
British writers